Ruellia makoyana, the monkey plant or trailing velvet plant, is a species of flowering plant in the family Acanthaceae, native to Brazil.

It has gained the Royal Horticultural Society's Award of Garden Merit.

References

House plants
makoyana